Phyllobates sp. aff. aurotaenia is a temporary name given to a likely new species of poison dart frog, formerly known as the "red" form of Phyllobates aurotaenia. It is morphologically similar to P. aurotaenia, but genetically it is more closely related to P. terribilis. It can  be distinguished from P. aurotaenia by its uniform chocolate brown or navy blue body, and its orange or red, rather than green or yellow, stripes.

Toxicity 
All Phyllobates species are highly toxic, and P. sp. aff. aurotaenia is no exception. Its skin contains batrachotoxins, extremely potent neurotoxic alkaloids. When in contact with the skin, batrachotoxins seep through open wounds and, in some cases, skin pores, and prevent nerves from transmitting impulses, leaving the muscles in an inactive state of contraction. This can lead to heart failure or fibrillation. Some native people use this poison to hunt by coating darts with the frogs' poison. Alkaloid batrachotoxins can be stored by frogs for years after the frog is deprived of the food-based source, and such toxins do not readily deteriorate, even when transferred to another surface. Chickens and dogs have died from contact with a paper towel on which the more toxic P. terribilis had walked.

References 

A
Undescribed vertebrate species